The men's Pole Vault at the 2014 IAAF World Indoor Championships took place on 8 March 2014. The best vaulter of the 2014 indoor season, France's Renaud Lavillenie did not compete at Sopot after suffering a foot injury shortly after he set a new world record of 6.16 metres on 15 February at Donetsk, Ukraine.

Medalists

Records

Qualification standards

Schedule

Results

References

Pole Vault
Pole vault at the World Athletics Indoor Championships